The Luna programme (from the Russian word  "Luna" meaning "Moon"), occasionally called Lunik by western media, was a series of robotic spacecraft missions sent to the Moon by the Soviet Union between 1959 and 1976. Fifteen were successful, each designed as either an orbiter or lander, and accomplished many firsts in space exploration. They also performed many experiments, studying the Moon's chemical composition, gravity, temperature, and radiation.

Twenty-four spacecraft were formally given the Luna designation, although more were launched. Those that failed to reach orbit were not publicly acknowledged at the time, and not assigned a Luna number. Those that failed in low Earth orbit were usually given Cosmos designations. The estimated cost of the Luna programme in 1964 was US$6–10 billion.

Mission types 
The name Luna was used to designate a variety of spacecraft designs, to achieve several types of missions:

Impactors 

Impactor spacecraft are designed to hit the near side of the Moon. Luna 1 (January 1959) missed its intended impact with the Moon and became the first spacecraft to escape the Earth-Moon system. Luna 2 (September 1959) mission successfully hit the Moon's surface, becoming the first man-made object to reach the Moon. This was Luna's only impact success out of six tries from September 1958 to September 1959.

The United States competed with the Luna impactors via the Ranger programme, which performed four successful impacts in nine attempts from August 1961 to March 1965.

Flybys 

A flyby is the simplest lunar spacecraft, requiring neither a propulsion device for slowing, nor a guidance system sensitive enough to hit the Moon. Its function is to transmit photographs back to Earth. Luna 3 (October 1959) rounded the Moon later that year, and returned the first photographs of its far side, which can never be seen from Earth. This was Luna's only successful flyby, out of three tries from October 1959 to April 1960.

The United States launched two lunar flyby probes as part of its Pioneer program. Pioneer 3, launched on 6 December 1958, failed to reach the Moon. Pioneer 4 succeeded in flying by the Moon on 6 March 1959 and achieved a heliocentric orbit.

Soft landers 

Soft landers require rocket propulsion to slow their speed sufficiently to prevent the craft's destruction. They can continue to transmit pictures from the surface, and possibly dig into the lunar soil or return other information about the lunar environment. 

Luna program landers had the generic designation of Ye-6 (or E-6 depending on transliteration from Russian). Two successful soft landings were achieved out of thirteen attempts from January 1963 to December 1966. 

Luna 9 (E-6 No.13) became the first probe to achieve a soft landing on another planetary body in February 1966. It transmitted five black and white stereoscopic circular panoramas, which were the first close-up shots of the lunar surface. 

The United States competed with the Luna landers by the Surveyor programme, which performed five successful landings out of seven attempts from June 1966 to January 1968.

Orbiters 
Orbiter spacecraft require less thrust and propellant than landers, but still require enough to achieve lunar orbit insertion. Luna 10 (March 1966) became the first artificial satellite of the Moon. Luna flew six successful orbiters out of eight attempts from March 1966 to May 1974.

The United States attempted a series of seven lunar orbiter probes as part of its Pioneer program from August 1958 to December 1960; all (Pioneer 0, Pioneer 1, Pioneer 2, Pioneer P-1, Pioneer P-3, Pioneer P-30, and Pioneer P-31) were failures. Later, the US successfully flew five Lunar Orbiter spacecraft from August 1966 to August 1967, to map 99% of the lunar surface and help select landing sites for the Apollo crewed landing programme.

Rovers 

More sophisticated soft lander craft can deploy wheeled vehicles to explore a wider area of the lunar surface than the immediate landing site. The first attempted Lunokhod failed in February 1969. Luna 17 (November 1970) and Luna 21 (January 1973) carried Lunokhod vehicles, which were the first robotic wheeled vehicles to explore the Moon's terrain. Lunokhod 1 travelled  in 322 days and returned more than 20,000 television images and 206 high-resolution panoramas. Lunokhod 2 operated for about four months, covered  of terrain, A third Lunokhod was built and intended for launch in 1977, but never flew due to lack of launchers and funding.

The United States landed crewed rovers (Lunar Roving Vehicles) on Apollo 15 (July–August 1971), Apollo 16 (April 1972), and Apollo 17 (December 1972). Apollo 15 covered ; Apollo 16 covered , and Apollo 17 covered .

Sample return 

 

More complex soft lander craft can robotically scoop up a small amount of lunar material, lift off from the surface, and return the material to Earth. Luna 16 (September 1970), Luna 20 (February 1972) and Luna 24 (August 1976), returned samples of lunar soil to Earth.

The United States achieved lunar sample return with crewed lunar landings on the Apollo program, which successfully landed six two-man crews out of seven attempts from July 1969 to December 1972.

Luna 15 (July 1969) flew at the same time as the Apollo 11 mission. Neil Armstrong and Buzz Aldrin had already performed the first crewed lunar landing when Luna 15 began its descent, and the spacecraft crashed into a mountain minutes later.

Mission success rates 
While the programme was active, it was Soviet practice not to release any details of missions that had failed to achieve orbit. This resulted in Western observers assigning their own designations to the missions. For example, Luna E-1 No.1, the first failure of 1958 which NASA believed was associated with the Luna programme, was known as Luna 1958A.

Mission details

See also 

 Luna (rocket)
 Luna-Glob
 Soviet crewed lunar programs
 Soviet space program

References

External links 

 Lunar and Planetary Department Moscow University
 Luna Series (USSR) Profile by NASA's Solar System Exploration
 Encyclopædia Britannica, Luna Space Probe
 Soviet Luna Chronology
 Soviet Lunar Images
 Exploring the Moon: Luna Missions

 
Single-stage-to-orbit
Missions to the Moon
Soviet lunar program